Oelde is a town in the district of Warendorf, in North Rhine-Westphalia, Germany. It is located near Beckum.

Geography

Division of the town

Oelde consists of 5 districts:
 Oelde
 Stromberg
 Lette
 Sünninghausen
 Kirchspiel (with farming communities)
 Keitlinghausen
 Ahmenhorst
 Menninghausen

Neighbouring places

The neighboring municipalities and cities are clockwise, starting in the north:
 Beelen
 Herzebrock-Clarholz
 Rheda-Wiedenbrück
 Langenberg
 Wadersloh
 Beckum
 Ennigerloh

International relations

Oelde is twinned with:
  Niesky (Saxony, Germany)

History

The name Oelde was first mentioned in a document around 890 as "Ulithi im Dreingau" in the Urbar of the Werden monastery.

In 1457 a conflagration destroyed the city. In 1498, after the reconstruction, Oelde had 750 citizens. Another fire raged in 1605 and destroyed a total of 18 houses, barns and the town hall.

In 1939, Oelde was given its own exit when the motorway A 2 was built.

In the 1950s and 1960s, a high number of visitors came to Oelde when diplomats accepted the invitation of the Federal Presidents Heuss and Lübke to hunt small game in the state forest "Geisterholz". These events were commonly known as "diplomatic hunts."

In 2001 Oelde hosted one of the most important flower shows ever organized in Westphalia with more than 2.2 million visitors. Since then, the city garden, included in the exhibition grounds and embellished for the occasion, has been commercially exploited under the name "Park of the four seasons" (Vier-Jahreszeiten-Park).

Economy
Oelde is a centre of metal and lumber production, publishing, and also higher education through its nursing college.
It is also home to the headquarters of GEA (Westfalia Separator), a manufacturer of centrifuges and dairy machines and the headquarters of Haver & Boecker, a manufacturer of wire weaving.

Transport

Roads
Oelde is connected to the Bundesautobahn 2.

Railways

The Hamm–Minden railway connects Oelde station to the German rail network. The line is served by the Rhein-Weser-Express and the Ems-Börde-Bahn every hour.

References

External links
 Official site 
 Vier Jahreszeiten Park Oelde 
 European Garden Heritage Network